Imara dos Reis Ferreira (born February 14, 1948) better known as Imara Reis, is a Brazilian stage, television and film actress.

Biography
Imara Reis began acting on stage at Colégio Santa Marcelina. She's Graduated by the Universidade Federal Fluminense, where she also graduated at Theater, in the Grupo Laboratório, alongside Tonico Pereira and José Carlos Gondim. 
In 1973, invited by Tonico Pereira, Imara becomes a member of Grupo Chegança, whose notorious members are Ilva Niño, Elba Ramalho, Cátia de França and Tânia Alves.  In the late 1970s, on travel to France, she played Sílvia in her first short film of the same name, directed by Helena Rocha. 
In 2010, her biography, written by Thiago Sogayar Bechara. was published by the Imprensa Oficial do Estado de São Paulo.

Filmography

Film

Television

External links
 https://www.imdb.com/name/nm0718320/

1948 births
Living people
Brazilian actresses
Actresses from Rio de Janeiro (city)